The 2010 UCI Mountain Bike Marathon World Championships was the 8th edition of the UCI Mountain Bike Marathon World Championships held in Sankt Wendel, Germany.

Medal summary

Medal table

References

External links
Results

UCI Mountain Bike World Championships
UCI Mountain Bike Marathon World Championships
2010 UCI Mountain Bike Marathon World Championships
UCI Mountain Bike Marathon World Championships